The Faboideae are a subfamily of the flowering plant family Fabaceae or Leguminosae. An acceptable alternative name for the subfamily is Papilionoideae, or Papilionaceae when this group of plants is treated as a family.

This subfamily is widely distributed, and members are adapted to a wide variety of environments. Faboideae may be trees, shrubs, or herbaceous plants. Members include the pea, the sweet pea, the laburnum, and other legumes. The pea-shaped flowers are characteristic of the Faboideae subfamily and root nodulation is very common.

Genera
The type genus, Faba, is a synonym of Vicia, and is listed here as Vicia.

Abrus

Acmispon
Acosmium
Adenocarpus
Adenodolichos
Adesmia
Aenictophyton
Aeschynomene
Afgekia
Aganope
Airyantha
Aldina
Alexa
Alhagi
Alistilus
Almaleea
Alysicarpus
Amburana
Amicia
Ammodendron
Ammopiptanthus
Ammothamnus
Amphiodon
Amorpha
Amphicarpaea
Amphimas
Amphithalea
Anagyris
Anarthrophyllum
Ancistrotropis
Andira
Angylocalyx
Antheroporum
Anthyllis
Antopetitia
Aotus
Aphyllodium
Apios
Apoplanesia
Apurimacia
Arachis
Argyrocytisus
Argyrolobium
Arthroclianthus
Aspalathus
Astragalus
Ateleia
Austrocallerya
Austrodolichos
Austrosteenisia
Baphia
Baphiastrum
Baphiopsis
Baptisia
Barbieria
Behaimia

Bionia
Bituminaria
Bobgunnia
Bocoa
Bolusafra
Bolusanthus
Bolusia
Bossiaea
Bowdichia
Bowringia
Brongniartia
Brya
Bryaspis
Burkilliodendron
Butea
Cadia
Cajanus
Calia
Calicotome
Callerya
Callistachys
Calobota
Calophaca
Calopogonium
Calpurnia
Camoensia
Camptosema
Campylotropis
Canavalia
Candolleodendron
Caragana
Carmichaelia
Carrissoa
Cascaronia
Castanospermum
Centrolobium
Centrosema
Chadsia
Chaetocalyx
Chamaecytisus
Chapmannia
Chesneya
Chorizema
Christia
Cicer
Cladrastis
Clathrotropis
Cleobulia
Clianthus
Clitoria
Clitoriopsis
Cochlianthus
Cochliasanthus
Codariocalyx
Collaea
Cologania
Colutea
Condylostylis
Cordyla
Coronilla
Coursetia
Craibia
Cranocarpus
Craspedolobium
Cratylia
Cristonia
Crotalaria
Cruddasia
Cullen
Cyamopsis
Cyathostegia
Cyclocarpa
Cyclolobium
Cyclopia
Cymbosema
Cytisophyllum
Cytisopsis
Cytisus
Dahlstedtia
Dalbergia
Dalbergiella
Dalea
Dalhousiea
Daprainia
Daviesia
Decorsea
Dendrolobium
Derris
Dermatophyllum
Desmodiastrum
Desmodium
Dewevrea
Dichilus
Dicraeopetalum
Dillwynia
Dioclea
Diphyllarium
Diphysa
Diplotropis
Dipogon
Dipteryx
Discolobium
Disynstemon
Dolichopsis
Dolichos
Dorycnium
Droogmansia
Dumasia
Dunbaria
Dussia
Dysolobium
Ebenus
Echinospartum
Eleiotis
Eminia
Endosamara
Eremosparton
Erichsenia
Erinacea
Eriosema
Errazurizia
Erythrina
Etaballia
Euchilopsis
Euchlora
Euchresta
Eutaxia
Eversmannia
Exostyles
Eysenhardtia
Ezoloba
Fairchildia
Fiebrigiella
Fissicalyx
Flemingia
Fordia
Galactia
Galega
Gastrolobium
Geissaspis
Genista
Genistidium
Geoffroea
Gliricidia
Glycine
Glycyrrhiza
Gompholobium
Gonocytisus
Goodia
Grazielodendron
Guianodendron
Gueldenstaedtia
Halimodendron
Hammatolobium
Haplormosia
Hardenbergia
Harleyodendron
Harpalyce
Hebestigma
Hedysarum
Helicotropis
Herpyza
Hesperolaburnum
Hippocrepis
Hoita
Holocalyx
Hosackia
Hovea
Huangtcia 
Humularia
Hymenocarpos
Hymenolobium
Hypocalyptus
Indigastrum
Indigofera
Inocarpus
Isotropis
Jacksonia
Kanburia
Kennedia
Kotschya
Kummerowia
Lablab
+Laburnocytisus
Laburnum
Lackeya
Ladeania
Lamprolobium
Lathyrus
Latrobea
Lebeckia
Lecointea
Lembotropis
Lennea
Lens
Leobordea
Leptoderris
Leptodesmia
Leptolobium
Leptosema
Leptospron
Lespedeza
Lessertia
Leucomphalos
Limadendron
Liparia
Listia
Lonchocarpus
Lotononis
Lotus
Luetzelburgia
Lupinus
Luzonia
Maackia
Machaerium
Macropsychanthus
Macroptilium
Macrotyloma
Maraniona
Margaritolobium
Marina
Mastersia
Mecopus
Medicago
Melilotus
Melliniella
Melolobium
Microcharis
Mildbraediodendron
Millettia
Mirbelia
Monopteryx
Mucuna
Muellera
Muelleranthus
Mundulea
Myrocarpus
Myrospermum
Myroxylon
Mysanthus
Nanhaia
Neocollettia
Neoharmsia
Neonotonia
Neorautanenia
Neorudolphia
Nephrodesmus
Nesphostylis
Nissolia
Nogra
Oberholzeria
Olneya
Onobrychis
Ononis
Ophrestia
Orbexilum
Oreophysa
Ormocarpopsis
Ormocarpum
Ormosia
Orphanodendron
Ornithopus
Oryxis
Ostryocarpus
Otholobium
Otoptera
Ottleya
Oxylobium
Oxyrhynchus
Oxytropis
Pachyrhizus
Padbruggea
Panurea
Paracalyx
Paragoodia
Paramachaerium
Parochetus
Parryella
Pearsonia
Pediomelum
Pedleya

Periandra
Pericopsis
Petaladenium
Peteria
Petteria
Phaseolus
Phylacium
Phyllodium
Phyllota
Phylloxylon
Physostigma
Pickeringia
Pictetia
Piptanthus
Piscidia
Pisum
Plagiocarpus
Platycelyphium
Platycyamus
Platylobium
Platymiscium
Platypodium
Platysepalum
Podalyria
Podocytisus
Podolobium
Poecilanthe
Poiretia
Poitea
Polhillia
Polhillides
Pongamiopsis
Pseudarthria
Pseudeminia
Pseudoeriosema
Pseudovigna
Psophocarpus
Psoralea
Psoralidium
Psorothamnus
Pterocarpus
Pterodon
Ptycholobium
Ptychosema
Pueraria
Pultenaea
Pullenia
Pycnospora
Pyranthus
Rafnia
Ramirezella
Ramorinoa
Retama
Rhodopis
Rhynchosia
Rhynchotropis
Riedeliella
Robinia
Robynsiophyton
Rothia
Rupertia
Sakoanala
Salweenia
Sarcodum
Sartoria
Schefflerodendron
Scorpiurus
Sellocharis
Sesbania
Shuteria
Sigmoidala
Sigmoidotropis
Sinodolichos
Smirnowia
Smithia
Soemmeringia
Sophora

Spartium
Spartocytisus
Spathionema
Spatholobus
Sphaerolobium
Sphaerophysa
Sphenostylis
Sphinctospermum
Spirotropis
Spongiocarpella
Stauracanthus
Staminodianthus
Steinbachiella
Stirtonanthus
Stonesiella
Streblorrhiza
Strongylodon
Strophostyles
Stylosanthes
Styphnolobium
Swainsona
Swartzia
Sweetia
Sylvichadsia
Syrmatium
Tabaroa
Tadehagi
Taralea
Taverniera
Templetonia
Tephrosia
Teramnus
Teyleria
Thermopsis
Thinicola
Tipuana
Trifidacanthus
Trifolium
Trigonella
Tripodion
Trischidium
Uleanthus
Ulex
Uraria
Uribea
Urodon
Vandasina
Vatairea
Vataireopsis
Vatovaea
Vavilovia
Vermifrux
Verdesmum H. Ohashi & K. Ohashi 2012
Vicia
Vigna
Viminaria
Virgilia
Wajira
Weberbauerella
Whitfordiodendron
Wiborgia
Wiborgiella
Wisteria
Wisteriopsis
Xanthocercis
Xiphotheca
Zollernia
Zornia
Zygocarpum

Systematics
Modern molecular phylogenetics recommend a clade-based classification of Faboideae as a superior alternative to the traditional tribal classification of Polhill:

Note: Minor branches have been omitted.

Notes

References

External links

 Faboideae in L. Watson and M.J. Dallwitz (1992 onwards). The Families of Flowering Plants: Descriptions, Illustrations, Identification, Information Retrieval.

 
Rosid subfamilies